John Buckeridge (c. 1562 – 23 May 1631) was an English churchman.

Biography 
He was a son of William Buckeridge of Basildon, Berkshire, but was born in Draycot Cerne, Wiltshire. He was educated at the Merchant Taylors' School, Northwood and at St John's College, Oxford, his maternal grandfather being cousin to the founder, Sir Thomas White. He became a fellow of his college, and acted as tutor to William Laud, whose opinions were perhaps shaped by Buckeridge. After Oxford, Buckeridge held several livings, and was highly esteemed by King James I, whose chaplain he became.

In 1605 Buckeridge was elected President of St. John's College, a position which he vacated on being made bishop of Rochester in 1611. He was transferred to the bishopric of Ely in 1628, and died on 23 May 1631.

The bishop won some fame as a theologian and a controversialist. Among his intimate friends was Bishop Lancelot Andrewes, whose Ninety-six Sermons were published by Laud and Buckeridge in 1629.

Theology
Buckeridge is described as a convinced Arminian.

Notes and references

Citations

Sources

External links

1560s births
1631 deaths
17th-century Church of England bishops
Alumni of St John's College, Oxford
Arminian ministers
Arminian writers
Bishops of Ely
Bishops of Rochester
Fellows of St John's College, Oxford
People educated at Merchant Taylors' School, Northwood
People from Basildon, Berkshire
People from Wiltshire
Presidents of St John's College, Oxford
16th-century Anglican theologians
17th-century Anglican theologians